Leo III the Isaurian (685 – 18 June 741), also known as the Syrian, was Byzantine Emperor from 717 until his death in 741 and founder of the Isaurian dynasty. He put an end to the Twenty Years' Anarchy, a period of great instability in the Byzantine Empire between 695 and 717, marked by the rapid succession of several emperors to the throne. He also successfully defended the Empire against the invading Umayyads and forbade the veneration of icons.

Early life
Of Syrian extraction, Leo was born in Germanikeia, Commagene (modern Kahramanmaraş in Turkey). His original name was Konon (or Cononus). Some, including the Byzantine chronicler Theophanes, have claimed that Konon's family had been resettled in Thrace, where he entered the service of Emperor Justinian II, when the latter was advancing on Constantinople with an army of loyalist followers, and horsemen provided by Tervel of Bulgaria in 705. Leo was likely to have been a Jacobite Christian, but would have converted to the Chalcedonian creed upon joining the Byzantine hierarchy. Leo was fluent in Arabic, possibly as a native language, and was described by Theophanes as "the Saracen minded."

After the victory of Justinian II, Konon was dispatched on a diplomatic mission to Alania and Lazica to organize an alliance against the Umayyad Caliphate under Al-Walid I. According to the Chronicle of Theophanes Justinian wanted to get rid of Konon and took back the money that had been given to him to help advance Byzantine interests, thus leaving Konon stranded in Alania. The chronicle describes the mission as successful and Konon returning eventually to Justinian after crossing the Caucasus mountains in May with snowshoes and taking the fortress of Sideron (associated with Tsebelda) on the way.

Konon was appointed commander (stratēgos) of the Anatolic Theme by Emperor Anastasius II.  On his deposition, Konon joined with his colleague Artabasdus, the stratēgos of the Armeniac Theme, in conspiring to overthrow the new Emperor Theodosius III. Artabasdus was betrothed to Anna,
daughter of Leo as part of the agreement.

Siege of Constantinople

Leo entered Constantinople on 25 March 717 and forced the abdication of Theodosius III, becoming emperor as Leo III. The new emperor was immediately forced to attend to the Second Arab siege of Constantinople, which commenced in August of the same year. The Arabs were Umayyad forces sent by Caliph Sulayman ibn Abd al-Malik and serving under his brother Maslama ibn Abd al-Malik. They had taken advantage of the civil discord in the Byzantine Empire to bring a force of 80,000 to 150,000 men and a massive fleet to the Bosphorus.

Careful preparations, begun three years earlier under Anastasius II, and the stubborn resistance put up by Leo wore out the invaders. An important factor in the victory of the Byzantines was their use of Greek fire. The Arab forces also fell victim to Bulgarian reinforcements arriving to aid the Byzantines. Leo was allied with the Bulgarians but the chronicler Theophanes the Confessor was uncertain if they were still serving under Tervel of Bulgaria or his eventual successor Kormesiy of Bulgaria.

Unable to continue the siege in the face of the Bulgarian onslaught, the impenetrability of Constantinople's walls, and their own exhausted provisions, the Arabs were forced to abandon the siege in August 718. Sulayman himself had died the previous year and his successor Umar II would not attempt another siege. The siege had lasted 12 months.

Administration

Having thus saved the Empire from extinction, Leo proceeded to consolidate its administration, which in the previous years of anarchy had become completely disorganized. In 718 he suppressed a rebellion in Sicily; the following year saw the deposed Emperor Anastasios II raise an army and attempt to retake the throne, but he was captured and executed by Leo's government.

Leo secured the Empire's frontiers by inviting Slavic settlers into the depopulated districts and by restoring the army to efficiency; when the Umayyad Caliphate renewed its invasions in 726 and 739, as part of the campaigns of Hisham ibn Abd al-Malik, the Arab forces were decisively beaten, particularly at Akroinon in 740. His military efforts were supplemented by his alliances with the Khazars and the Georgians.

Leo undertook a set of civil reforms including the abolition of the system of prepaying taxes which had weighed heavily upon the wealthier proprietors, the elevation of the serfs into a class of free tenants and the remodelling of Family law, maritime law and criminal law, notably substituting mutilation for the death penalty in many cases. The new measures, which were embodied in a new code called the Ecloga (Selection), published in 726, met with some opposition on the part of the nobles and higher clergy. The Emperor also undertook some reorganization of the theme structure by creating new themata in the Aegean region.

Iconoclasm

Leo's most striking legislative reforms dealt with religious matters, especially iconoclasm ("icon-breaking," therefore an iconoclast is an "icon-breaker"). After an apparently successful attempt to enforce the baptism of all Jews and Montanists in the empire (722), he issued a series of edicts against the veneration of images (726–729).

A revolt which broke out in Greece, mainly on religious grounds, was crushed by the imperial fleet in 727 (cf. Agallianos Kontoskeles). In 730, Patriarch Germanos I of Constantinople resigned rather than subscribe to an iconoclastic decree. Leo had him replaced by Anastasios, who willingly sided with the Emperor on the question of icons. Thus Leo suppressed the overt opposition of the capital.

In the Italian Peninsula, the defiant attitude of Popes Gregory II and later Gregory III on behalf of image-veneration led to a fierce quarrel with the Emperor. The former summoned councils in Rome to anathematize and excommunicate the iconoclasts (730, 732); in 740 Leo retaliated by transferring Southern Italy and Illyricum from the papal diocese to that of the patriarch of Constantinople. The struggle was accompanied by an armed outbreak in the exarchate of Ravenna in 727, which Leo finally endeavoured to subdue by means of a large fleet. But the destruction of the armament by a storm decided the issue against him; his southern Italian subjects successfully defied his religious edicts, and the Exarchate of Ravenna became effectively detached from the Empire.

Scholars have discussed the mutual influence of Muslim and Byzantine iconoclasm, noting that Caliph Yazid II had issued an iconoclastic edict, also targeting his Christian subjects, already in 721.

Death and family

Leo III died of dropsy on 18 June 741 and was buried in the Church of the Holy Apostles.

With his wife Maria, Leo III had four known children:

 Constantine V, born in 718. He was crowned co-emperor in 720 and became senior emperor in 741. 
 Anna, born before 705. She married the future emperor Artabasdos.
Kosmo and Irene. They were both buried in a sarcophagus of Proconnesian marble in the Church of the Apostles.

See also

List of Byzantine emperors

Citations

General and cited references 
 
Entry of Leo III in The Oxford Dictionary of Byzantium, ed. Alexander Kazhdan. New York: Oxford University Press, 1991.

External links

 
 

 
685 births
710s in the Byzantine Empire
720s in the Byzantine Empire
730s in the Byzantine Empire
740s in the Byzantine Empire
741 deaths
8th-century Byzantine emperors
Byzantine Iconoclasm
Byzantine people of the Arab–Byzantine wars
Deaths from edema
Governors of the Anatolic Theme
Isaurian dynasty
Medieval legislators
People from Kahramanmaraş